Mamadou Ba (born 8 May 1985) is a Senegalese retired footballer who played as a goalkeeper. He earned one cap for the Senegal national team, won the 2010 Senegalese Ligue 1 title with ASC Jaraaf, and also played in the Primeira Liga during a playing career that spanned 13 years and five clubs.

Coaching career
After retiring as a player, Ba remained in Portugal and turned to coaching. In March 2021, he was announced as the goalkeeping coach for Pedras Rubras, competing in the Divisão de Elite of the Porto Football Association. He spent the 2021–22 season in that role on the staff of manager Mário Seara.

Personal life
Two of Ba's brothers also played professional football: both Abdoulaye and Pape Samba Ba earned caps for the Senegal national team.

Honours
ASC Jaraaf
 Senegalese Ligue 1: 2010
 Senegal FA Cup: 2008, 2009

See also

 List of foreign Primeira Liga players

References

External links
 
 
 Mamadou Ba at ForaDeJogo (archived)
 
 

1985 births
Living people
Senegalese footballers
Footballers from Dakar
Association football goalkeepers
ASC Jaraaf players
U.D. Oliveirense players
Boavista F.C. players
S.C. Ideal players
G.D. Peniche players
Senegal Premier League players
Primeira Liga players
Liga Portugal 2 players
Campeonato de Portugal (league) players
Senegal international footballers
Senegal A' international footballers
2009 African Nations Championship players
Senegalese expatriate footballers
Expatriate footballers in Portugal
Senegalese expatriate sportspeople in Portugal